Pedernales is a village in the Venezuelan state of Delta Amacuro on the Gulf of Paria.

References

Cities in Delta Amacuro
Port cities in Venezuela
Port cities in the Caribbean
Gulf of Paria